Break is the debut album by Japanese voice actor and actor turned singer, Mamoru Miyano. The album was released on March 11, 2009. The album was released in two formats: CD and CD+DVD version. Break contains the three singles that were released in 2007 and 2008.

Track listing

Charts

External links
 Official music site 

2009 debut albums
Mamoru Miyano albums
King Records (Japan) albums